Oscilla tornata is a species of sea snail, a marine gastropod mollusk in the family Pyramidellidae, the pyrams and their allies.

Description
The length of the shell measures 3 mm.

Distribution
This species occurs in the following locations:
 Northwest Atlantic from North Carolina to the Florida Keys at depths between 27 m and 260 m.

References

External links
 To Encyclopedia of Life
 To World Register of Marine Species

Pyramidellidae
Gastropods described in 1884